The Trincomalee line is a railway line in Sri Lanka. Branching off the Batticaloa line at Gal Oya Junction, the line heads north-east through North Central and Eastern provinces before terminating at the eastern city of Trincomalee. The line opened in 1927. The rail line was originally called the Batticaloa-Trincomalee Light Railway, as only locomotives with light axle loads were permitted. The circuitous route led to some rail employees wondering if the construction costs were paid on a mileage basis, with a manager stating "it followed the path of an intelligent cow". In the 1950s the route was deviated removing a number of sharp curves and steep gradients together with a switch to heavier rails to match the rest of the country's rail system.

References

Railway lines in Sri Lanka
Railway lines opened in 1927
Transport in Eastern Province, Sri Lanka
Transport in North Central Province, Sri Lanka
5 ft 6 in gauge railways in Sri Lanka
1927 establishments in Ceylon